Murkel Alejandro Dellien Velasco (born 16 September 1997) is a Bolivian tennis player.

Dellien represents Bolivia at the Davis Cup, where he has a W/L record of 1–0. He defeated Zizou Bergs in his first Davis Cup rubber.

Dellien played college tennis at Wichita State. He is the younger brother of fellow tennis player Hugo.

ATP Challenger and ITF World Tennis Tour finals

Singles: 8 (4–4)

Doubles: 1 (0–1)

References

External links
 
 
 

1997 births
Living people
Bolivian male tennis players
Wichita State Shockers men's tennis players
People from Trinidad, Bolivia